Müezzin is a 2009 Austrian-Turkish documentary film directed by Sebastian Brameshuber about the annual Turkish competition for the best muezzin. The film was selected for the 29th International Istanbul Film Festival and 16th London Turkish Film Festival.

Release

Festival screenings 
 44th Karlovy Vary International Film Festival (July 3–11, 2009)
 15th Sarajevo International Film Festival (August 12–20, 2009)
 29th International Istanbul Film Festival (April 3–18, 2010)
 12th Buenos Aires International Film Festival (April 7–18, 2010)
 16th London Turkish Film Festival (November 4–18, 2010)

See also
 List of Islamic films
 2009 in film
 Turkish films of 2009

References

External links
  for the film
 

2009 films
Austrian documentary films
2009 documentary films
Documentary films about Islam
Turkish documentary films